Prince Johannes Heinrich of Saxe-Coburg and Gotha-Koháry (Johannes Heinrich Friedrich Werner Konrad Rainer Maria; Slovak: Ján Henrich, Hungarian: János Henrik; 28 March 1931, in Innsbruck – 14 April 2010, in Innsbruck) was a prince of the House of Saxe-Coburg and Gotha-Koháry and the last holder of Csábrág and Szitnya, both in modern-day Slovakia, lost to the communist regime of Czechoslovakia. He was the only son of Prince Rainer of Saxe-Coburg and Gotha by his first wife, Johanna Károlyi von Károlyi-Patty und Vasvár.

Life
In Munich on 24 October 1957, Johannes Heinrich married, firstly, Baroness Gabrielle von Fürstenberg (22 June 1921 – 5 October 2007). They had one daughter:
Princess Felicitas of Saxe-Coburg and Gotha-Koháry (b. Sorengo, 6 April 1958) she married Serge Trotzky, from ancient Russian nobility on 15 November 1987. They have six children:
Konstantin Trotzky (16 March 1988)
Marie-Eudoxie Trotzky (29. June 1989), who married Count Leo Czernin von und zu Chudenitz in September 2017.
Nikolaus Trotzky (9 July 1991)
Xenia Trotzky (25. February 1993)
Tatjana Trotzky (1996)
Alexander Trotzky (21. May 2003)

Johannes Heinrich and Gabrielle were divorced on 4 July 1968. Four months later, in Munich on 12 November 1968, Johannes Heinrich married, secondly, Princess Mathilde of Saxony, a medical doctor and granddaughter of King Frederick Augustus III of Saxony. They had one son:
 Prince Johannes of Saxe-Coburg and Gotha-Koháry (17 November 1969 – 21 August 1987).

Johannes Heinrich and Mathilde divorced on 27 August 1993. Johannes Heinrich also had an illegitimate daughter named Christine Johanna Wieser (b. 29 March 1968 in Innsbruck) with Dr. Med. Edda Wieser (6 November 1940 – 16 December 1996).

After the death of Johannes Heinrich, the heir to the House of Saxe-Coburg-Gotha-Koháry is the former King Simeon II of Bulgaria, due to the exclusion of Johannes Heinrich's uncle Philipp's morganatic marriage on 23 April 1944 to Sarah Aurelia Halasz, and his descendants (their only son and four grandchildren were barred from the succession).

Ancestry

References

1931 births
2010 deaths
People from Innsbruck
House of Saxe-Coburg-Gotha-Koháry
Princes of Saxe-Coburg and Gotha